This is a list of singles that charted in the top ten of the Billboard Hot 100 during 1997. During this year, "How Do I Live" by LeAnn Rimes became the longest-running top-ten single, breaking a record for 32 weeks (a record that went unmatched for over nineteen years).

Puff Daddy and Mase each had four top-ten hits in 1997, tying them for the most top-ten hits during the year.

Top-ten singles
Key
 – indicates single's top 10 entry was also its Hot 100 debut

1996 peaks

1998 peaks

See also
1997 in music
List of Billboard Hot 100 number-one singles of 1997
Billboard Year-End Hot 100 singles of 1997

References

General sources

Joel Whitburn Presents the Billboard Hot 100 Charts: The Nineties
Additional information obtained can be verified within Billboard's online archive services and print editions of the magazine.

1997
1997 record charts